Shaji Paul Chaly (born 29 May 1961) is a judge on the Kerala High Court, the highest court in the Indian state of Kerala and in the Union Territory of Lakshadweep.

Education and career
Chaly attended Sree Rama Varma High School, Ernakulam, then Maharaja's College, Ernakulam and finally obtained a law degree from Government Law College, Ernakulam. He enrolled as an advocate in 1986 and started practice at Ernakulam. On 10 April 2015, he was appointed as additional judge of Kerala High Court and became a permanent member of the court on 5 April 2017.

References

External links
 High Court of Kerala

Living people
Judges of the Kerala High Court
21st-century Indian judges
1961 births
Indian judges